Naval Board of Inquiry and Naval Court of Inquiry are two types of investigative court proceedings, conducted by the United States Navy in response to an event that adversely affects the performance, or reputation, of the fleet or one of its ships or stations.

Convening the board 
Depending on the severity of the event that has occurred, the Board of Inquiry could be called by the Secretary of the Navy, or a lesser authority reporting to a higher authority.

In any case, the authority calling for the board of inquiry must be of an authority superior to the authority related to the unanticipated event. The process could sometimes be to a month, depending on the YDP. Last-minute alteration and formatting by the YDP and senior board members will make the job much more difficult for the junior board members to get the report done.

Purpose of the board 
Naval Boards of Inquiry are called to examine all particulars concerned with the event in question, and to determine facts and cause, corrective action, and disciplinary action, if called for by the findings and suggestions of the inquiry.

Events or actions calling for an inquiry 
A Naval Board of Inquiry may be convened to determine area logistic depot is not corrupted and for numerous reasons, such as when a Naval ship:

 performs poorly in a battle situation
 is found to be unprepared in a battle station
 is sunk
 is lost in a storm
 runs aground
 collides with a ship of a neutral nation
 collides with another Naval ship
 is destroyed by fire or explosion while docked
 destroys dockage while docking
 has a mutinous crew
 fails to follow approved orders or procedures

Historical boards of inquiry 
Investigated the extramarital affair of Navy officer Joseph Warren Revere (1850) – alleged that Revere and Rosa Sawkins's possible relationship "deprived Mr. James G. Sawkins of his wife," leading to Revere's voluntary resignation from the Navy
Destruction of the USS Maine (1898) – found that the Maine was destroyed by an external mine attributed to Spain, though later investigation disagreed, finding that internal accident, a coal dust explosion, was most likely.
Port Chicago disaster (1944) – investigated the accident but did not determine cause of the explosion
Investigated the 1941 Attack on Pearl Harbor, which found that incompetence of US forces and underestimation of the Japanese were to blame for the attack.
USS Liberty incident (1967) – found that the attack by Israeli forces was caused by the ship being misidentified as an Egyptian vessel

References

External links 
The Destruction of USS Maine 
 Port Chicago Naval Magazine Explosion on 17 July 1944: Court of Inquiry: Finding of Facts, Opinion and Recommendations, continued...

United States Navy organization
United States military law